Zaton is a rural locality (a selo) in Solonetskoye Rural Settlement, Vorobyovsky District, Voronezh Oblast, Russia. The population was 739 as of 2010. There are 5 streets.

Geography 
Zaton is located 17 km west of Vorobyovka (the district's administrative centre) by road. Solontsy is the nearest rural locality.

References 

Rural localities in Vorobyovsky District